The current position for Malaysian Minister of Home Affairs is hold by Saifuddin Nasution Ismail since 3 December 2022. The minister is supported by the Deputy Ministers of Home Affairs. The Minister administers the portfolio through the Ministry of Home Affairs.

List of ministers of home affairs
The following individuals have been appointed as Minister of Home Affairs, or any of its precedent titles:

Political Party:

List of ministers of interior
The following individuals have been appointed as Minister of Interior, or any of its precedent titles:

Political Party:

List of ministers of justice
The following individuals have been appointed as Minister of Justice, or any of its precedent titles:

Political Party:

List of ministers of law
The following individuals have been appointed as Minister of Law, or any of its precedent titles:

Political Party:

List of ministers of internal security
The following individuals have been appointed as Minister of Internal Security, or any of its precedent titles:

Political Party:

List of Ministers in the Prime Minister's Department (Law Affairs) 
Political Party:

References

 
 
Ministry of Home Affairs (Malaysia)
Lists of government ministers of Malaysia
Prisons ministers
Justice ministers